Antonel Borșan (born 29 April 1970 in Liești, Galați County) is a Romanian sprint canoer who competed in the mid-1990s. He won an Olympic silver medal at the 1996 Summer Olympics in the C-2 1000 m event with Marcel Glăvan.

Borșan also won seven medals at the ICF Canoe Sprint World Championships with two golds (C-4 1000 m: 1995, 1997) and five silvers (C-2 1000 m: 1995, C-4 500 m: 1994, 1995, 1997; C-4 1000 m: 1994).

References

1970 births
Living people
People from Liești
Romanian male canoeists
Olympic canoeists of Romania
Olympic silver medalists for Romania
Olympic medalists in canoeing
Canoeists at the 1996 Summer Olympics
Medalists at the 1996 Summer Olympics
ICF Canoe Sprint World Championships medalists in Canadian